Tajudeen Oyekanmi (born 23 February 1969) is a Nigerian footballer. He played in two matches for the Nigeria national football team in 1990. He was also named in Nigeria's squad for the 1990 African Cup of Nations tournament.

References

1969 births
Living people
Nigerian footballers
Nigeria international footballers
1990 African Cup of Nations players
Place of birth missing (living people)
Association football midfielders